Farafangana is a district of Atsimo-Atsinanana in Madagascar.

Communes
The district is further divided into 30 communes:

 Ambalatany
 Ambalavato
 Ambohigogo
 Ambohimandroso
 Amporoforo
 Ankarana Miraihina
 Anosivelo
 Anosy Tsararafa
 Antsiranambe
 Beretra Bevoay
 Efatsy Anandroza
 Etrotroka Sud
 Evato
 Farafangana
 Fenoarivo
 Iabohazo
 Ihorombe
 Ivandrika
 Mahabo Mananivo
 Mahafasa Centre
 Mahavelo
 Maheriraty
 Manambotra Sud
 Marovandrika
 Sahamadio
 Tangainony
 Tovona
 Vohilengo
 Vohimasy
 Vohitromby

Economy
There is an airport in Farafangana (Farafangana Airport).  One of the main crops in the region is pepper.

Population
Natives are mainly from ethnic groups Antefasy, Rabakara, Antesaka and Zafisoro.

Education
Farafangana has a university.

Tourism
The Manombo Reserve is located at 25 km to Farafangana.

See also
 Diocese of Farafangana 
 Manombo Reserve

References 

Districts of Atsimo-Atsinanana